Agios Antonios is a village and a community of the Thermi municipality. Before the 2011 local government reform it was part of the municipality of Vasilika, of which it was a municipal district. The 2011 census recorded 647 inhabitants in the village and 874 inhabitants in the community. The community of Agios Antonios covers an area of 50.023 km2.

Administrative division
The community of Agios Antonios consists of two separate settlements: 
Agios Antonios (population 647)
Monopigado (population 227)
The aforementioned population figures are as of 2011.

See also
 List of settlements in the Thessaloniki regional unit

References

Populated places in Thessaloniki (regional unit)